Lamina is a monotypic fossil genus of agglutinated foraminifera belonging to the subfamily Ammomarginulinae. It contains the sole species Lamina irreperta, described in 1972.

References

Globothalamea
Fossil taxa described in 1972